Skollis, also known as Santameri, is a mountain in southwestern Achaea in the Peloponnese in western Greece. It is situated between the villages Santomeri to the north and  Portes to the south.

References

External links

Mountains of Greece
Landforms of Achaea
Mountains of Western Greece